Trevance is a hamlet east of St Issey, Cornwall, England, United Kingdom.

References

Hamlets in Cornwall